John William Morfitt (28 September 1908 – 1973) was an English professional footballer who scored 21 goals in 77 appearances in the Football League playing for Birmingham, Blackpool, Bradford and Southend United. He played as a centre forward.

Morfitt was born in Sheffield, Yorkshire. He played local football in the Sheffield area and for Mansfield Town in the Midland League before he joined First Division club Birmingham in March 1928. His game was based on pace rather than strength, and he played only once for Birmingham's first team, on 21 March 1931 in a 2–1 home defeat to Middlesbrough. Later that year he joined fellow First Division club Blackpool, where again he played only once (in a 1–1 draw, against the club he had just left, at Bloomfield Road on 12 September), and in March 1932 he dropped down a division to sign for Bradford. Five goals in nine games for Bradford preceded another move, this time to Southend United of the Third Division South. Here Morfitt finally got regular first-team football. In four years he scored 23 goals in 81 appearances in all competitions before injury forced his retirement from the game in 1936.

Morfitt died in 1973, aged 64 or 65.

References

1908 births
1973 deaths
Footballers from Sheffield
English footballers
Association football forwards
Heeley F.C. players
Anston Athletic F.C. players
Mansfield Town F.C. players
Birmingham City F.C. players
Blackpool F.C. players
Bradford (Park Avenue) A.F.C. players
Southend United F.C. players
English Football League players
Date of death missing
Place of death missing